HMS Foley has been the name of more than one ship of the Royal Navy, and may refer to:

 HMS Foley (BDE-22), a frigate constructed in the United States originally intended for service in the Royal Navy but instead retained by the United States Navy, in which she served as the destroyer escort  from 1943 to 1945
 , a frigate in commission from 1943 to 1945

Royal Navy ship names